Four Last Things is a point-and-click adventure video game (see List of graphic adventure games). Made by Joe Richardson, it came out on 23 February 2017 for Windows, Android, and iOS.

PCGamer said that the game was a “Monty Python-esque, painterly point and click.”

Four Last Things has animated paintings that have been stitched together into a game world.

It has a sequel, The Procession to Calvary.

Reception

The game, its concept, and its art were given a fairly decent review in PC Gamer, although the lack of a manual save function was criticized.

It was nominated for Best Art at the Independent Games Festival's award show in Brazil in June 2017.

The International Business Times included it on a list of eight “innovative” indie games at the London Games Festival. The IBT liked the “witty writing” of Richardson, the use of the public domain Renaissance-era paintings, and that the game allowed you to slap bishops.

References

External links
 

2017 video games
Adventure games
Android (operating system) games
IOS games
Point-and-click adventure games
Seven deadly sins in popular culture
Video games developed in the United Kingdom
Video games set in England
Windows games